In economics, a price mechanism is the manner in which the profits of goods or services affects the supply and demand of goods and services, principally by the price elasticity of demand. A price mechanism affects both buyer and seller who negotiate prices. A price mechanism, part of a market system, comprises various ways to match up buyers and sellers. 

The price mechanism is an economic model where price plays a key role in directing the activities of producers, consumers, and resource suppliers.
An example of a price mechanism uses announced bid and ask prices. Generally speaking, when two parties wish to engage in trade, the purchaser will announce a price he is willing to pay (the bid price) and the seller will announce a price he is willing to accept (the ask price).

The primary advantage of such a method is that conditions are laid out in advance and transactions can proceed with no further permission or authorization from any participant.  When any bid and ask pair are compatible, a transaction occurs, in most cases automatically.

Samuelson wrote that "the price mechanism, working through supply and demand in competitive markets, operates to (simultaneously) answer the three fundamental problems of economic organization in our mixed private enterprise system..." and establish an equilibrium system of prices and production. At competitive equilibrium, the value society places on a good is equivalent to the value of the resources given up to produce it (marginal benefit equals marginal cost). This ensures allocative efficiency: the additional value society places on another unit of the good is equal to what society must give up in resources to produce it.

Working of the price mechanism
Under a price mechanism, if demand increases, prices will rise, causing a movement along the supply curve.

For example: the oil crisis of the 1970s drove oil prices dramatically upwards, which in turn caused several countries to begin producing oil domestically. 

A price mechanism affects every economic situation in the long term. Price Mechanism plays a vital role in determining prices in a capitalist economy. An example of the effects of a price mechanism, in the long run, involves fuel for cars. If fuel becomes more expensive, then the demand for fuel would not decrease fast but eventually, companies will start to produce alternatives such as biodiesel fuel and electrical cars.
A price mechanism is a system by which the allocation of resources and distribution of goods and services are made on the basis of relative market price.
There are two important elements of price mechanism –
1. PRICES - prices are essence of price mechanism. Price mechanism works through prices in a free enterprise economy, where all goods and services carry price tags with them. A whole set of prices prevail in such an economy. Goods and services are available at a price because it involves cost in producing these goods and services. Consumers have to pay some prices if they want to buy some goods like food, clothes, etc. Producers are willing to sell  goods and services only if they get the appropriate price.
2. MARKET - forces of demand and supply operate within the framework of market. Market constitute an integral part of the price mechanism A market means a system or a set-up in which the buyers and sellers of the commodity are able to interact and communicate with each other and strike a deal, i.e., price and the quantity to be bought and sold.

Auctions

An auction is a price mechanism where bidders can make competing offers for a good.  The minimum bid may or may not be set by the seller, who may choose to predetermine a minimum asking price.  The highest bidder would be awarded the transaction.

Other applications
If the terms "pay" and "sell" are understood very generally, then, a very broad range of applications and different market systems can be enabled this way.  Internet dating for instance could be based on offers to talk for a period of time, accepted by those who are compensated not in money but in additional credits to keep using the system.  Or, a political party could trade support for different measures in a platform, perhaps using allocation voting to "bid" a certain amount of support for a measure that a leader has "asked" them to support: if the measure has enough support in the party, the leader will proceed; a very explicit model of so-called "political capital".

Though there are many concerns about liquidating any given transaction, even in a conventional market, there are ideologies which hold that the risks are outweighed by the efficient rendezvous. In greenhouse gas emissions trading, companies doing the "bidding" argue that Earth's atmosphere can be seen as affected almost uniformly by emissions anywhere on Earth. They argue further that, as a result, there are almost no local effects, and only a measurable and widely agreed climate change effect, of a greenhouse gas emission, justifying a "cap and trade" approach. Somewhat more controversially, the approach was applied even earlier to sulfur dioxide emissions in the United States, and was quite successful in reducing overall smog output there.

In most applications of such methods, however, the comprehensive outcome of the transaction is not so easily measured or universally agreed. Some theorists assert that, with appropriate controls, a market mechanism can replace a hierarchy, even a command hierarchy, by ordering actions for which the highest bid is received:

An infamous example is the assassination market proposed by Timothy C. May, which were effectively bets on someone's death. This has since been generalized into the prediction market idea which the Pentagon proposed to operate as part of Total Information Awareness; however, this proved controversial as it would theoretically let assassins predict and then benefit from their predictions, which they would cause to come true. This is a problem even with the commodity markets and any other financial markets, where a single person's choices or fate might be influenced, predicted, or decided by someone already in the market.

So price mechanism is a technique by which inflation is controlled. The price can only be increased if the supply is less and has more demand for the same.

Less controversial applications of bid and ask matching include:
industrial process control
various applications in social networks (including dating above)
calculating interest in court judgments or homestead credit
determining which of several assets in a divorce are most prized by each party, and accordingly, who should receive what for maximum amiability and minimum capital asset sale and lifestyle disruption

See also
 Price signal
 Price system

References 

Macroeconomics
Microeconomics